This article contains information about the literary events and publications of 1954.

Events
January – Kingsley Amis's first novel, the comic campus novel Lucky Jim, is published by Victor Gollancz Ltd in London.
January 7 – The Georgetown–IBM experiment is the first public demonstration of a machine translation system, held in New York at the IBM head office.
January 25 – Dylan Thomas's radio play Under Milk Wood is first broadcast in the U.K. on the BBC Third Programme, two months after its author's death, with Richard Burton as "First Voice".
February – The London Magazine is revived as a literary magazine, with John Lehmann as editor.
March 31 – A. L. Zissu is sentenced in Bucharest to life imprisonment for "conspiring against the social order". This has been a focal point in the anti-Zionist clampdown in Communist Romania.
May 29 – The rediscovered and restored early 17th-century Corral de comedias de Almagro in Spain is re-inaugurated with a play by Calderon de la Barca.
June 16 – The first public celebration of "Bloomsday" takes place in Dublin: writers Flann O'Brien, Patrick Kavanagh and Anthony Cronin travel in a horse-drawn coach, stopping at numerous bars to retrace the steps of the characters from James Joyce's novel Ulysses.
June 22 – In the Parker–Hulme murder case, the 15-year-old Julia Hulme, a future writer of English historical detective fiction as Anne Perry, takes part in the murder of her best friend's mother in Christchurch, New Zealand.
July 29 – The first volume of J. R. R. Tolkien's epic The Lord of the Rings – The Fellowship of the Ring – is published in London by George Allen & Unwin. The Two Towers follows on November 11 and publication will be completed in 1955. By 2007, 150 million copies will have been sold worldwide.
September 1 – Lawrence Quincy Mumford becomes the U.S.Librarian of Congress.
September 17 – William Golding's first novel, the allegorical dystopian Lord of the Flies, is published by Faber and Faber in London.
September 22 – Terence Rattigan's two linked plays Separate Tables is first performed, at St James's Theatre, London.
October 30 – John Updike's first story for The New Yorker, "Friends from Philadelphia", is published. He graduates from Harvard with a thesis on George Herbert, and begins a year's Frank Knox Memorial Fellowship to the Ruskin School of Drawing and Fine Art at England's University of Oxford.  
November 19 – Brendan Behan's first play, The Quare Fellow is premièred at the Pike Theatre, Dublin.
unknown date – Jack Kerouac reads Dwight Goddard's A Buddhist Bible (1932, found in San Jose library), which will influence him greatly.

New books

Fiction
Kingsley Amis – Lucky Jim
Poul Anderson – The Broken Sword
 Thomas Armstrong – Pilling Always Pays
Isaac Asimov – The Caves of Steel
James Baldwin – Go Tell It on the Mountain
Hamilton Basso – The View from Pompey's Head
John Bingham – The Third Skin
Boileau-Narcejac – The Living and the Dead (D'entre les morts)
Lucy M. Boston – Yew Hall
Pierre Boulle – The Bridge over the River Kwai (Le Pont de la Rivière Kwaï)
Taylor Caldwell – Never Victorious, Never Defeated
Victor Canning – Castle Minerva
John Dickson Carr
The Third Bullet and Other Stories
The Exploits of Sherlock Holmes (with Adrian Conan Doyle)
  Henry Cecil – According to the Evidence
Agatha Christie – Destination Unknown
Robertson Davies – Leaven of Malice
 Cecil Day-Lewis – The Whisper in the Gloom
Simone de Beauvoir – The Mandarins (Les Mandarins)
Daphne du Maurier – Mary Anne
Ian Fleming – Live and Let Die
Max Frisch – I'm Not Stiller (Stiller)
Anthony Gilbert – Snake in the Grass
William Golding – Lord of the Flies
Richard Gordon – The Captain's Table
Walter Greenwood – What Everybody Wants
 James Hadley Chase – The Sucker Punch
Joan Henry – Yield to the Night
Hergé – Explorers on the Moon (On a marché sur la Lune)
Hwang Sun-won – The Descendants of Cain (카인의 후예)
Mac Hyman – No Time for Sergeants
 Hammond Innes – The Strange Land
 Michael Innes – Appleby Talking
Randall Jarrell – Pictures from an Institution: a comedy
Yasunari Kawabata (川端 康成) – The Sound of the Mountain (Yama no Oto; serialization concludes)
Frances Parkinson Keyes – The Royal Box
Kalki Krishnamurthy
Amara Thara
Ponniyin Selvan (பொன்னியின் செல்வன், "The Son of Ponni"; publication concludes)
Manuel Mujica Láinez – La casa (The House)
George Lamming – The Emigrants
Jacques Laurent – Mata Hari's Daughter
Camara Laye – Le Regard du roi
Ira Levin – A Kiss Before Dying
Astrid Lindgren – Mio, My Son
E. C. R. Lorac 
 Let Well Alone
 Shroud of Darkness
Ross Macdonald – Find a Victim
Compton Mackenzie – Ben Nevis Goes East
Kamala Markandaya – Nectar in a Sieve
John Masters – Bhowani Junction
Richard Matheson – I Am Legend
John Metcalfe – The Feasting Dead
James A. Michener – Sayonara
Paul Morand – Hecate and Her Dogs
Alberto Moravia – Il disprezzo (A Ghost at Noon)
Iris Murdoch – Under the Net
Louis Pauwels – L'Amour monstre
J. B. Priestley – The Magicians
Maurice Procter – Hell Is a City
Marcel Proust – Jean Sauteuil (posthumously published)
Ellery Queen – The Glass Village
Pauline Réage (Anne Desclos) – Story of O (Histoire d'O)
Mordecai Richler – The Acrobats
Lillian Roth – I'll Cry Tomorrow
Françoise Sagan – Bonjour Tristesse<ref>No. 41 in [[Le Monde's 100 Books of the Century|Le Monde'''s 100 Books of the Century]]. </ref>
Ahmed Sefrioui – La Boîte à merveillesAnya Seton – KatherineMargit Söderholm – Clouds Over HellestaJohn Steinbeck – Sweet ThursdayIrving Stone – Love Is EternalRex StoutThe Black MountainThree Men OutEdward Streeter – Mr. Hobbs Takes a VacationJulian Symons – The Narrowing CircleAhmet Hamdi Tanpınar – Saatleri Ayarlama Enstitüsü (The Time Regulation Institute)
Morton Thompson – Not as a StrangerJ. R. R. TolkienThe Lord of the Rings: The Fellowship of the RingThe Lord of the Rings: The Two TowersAmos Tutuola – My Life in the Bush of GhostsTarjei Vesaas – Spring NightGore Vidal – MessiahDouglass Wallop – The Year the Yankees Lost the PennantMonique Watteau – La Colère végétaleVaughan Wilkins – Fanfare for a WitchFrank Yerby 
 Benton's Row Bride of LibertyChildren and young people
Rev. W. Awdry – Edward the Blue Engine (ninth in The Railway Series of 42 books by him and his son Christopher Awdry)
Viola Bayley – Paris Adventure (first in the Adventure series of 16 books)
Lucy M. Boston – The Children of Green Knowe (first in the Green Knowe series of six books)
Eleanor Cameron – The Wonderful Flight to the Mushroom PlanetMeindert DeJong – The Wheel on the School (illustrated by Maurice Sendak)
Rumer Godden – Impunity Jane: The Story of a Pocket DollJoseph Krumgold – ...And Now MiguelC. S. Lewis – The Horse and His BoyDr. Seuss – Horton Hears a Who!Rosemary Sutcliff – The Eagle of the NinthHenry TreeceLegions of the EagleThe Eagles Have FlownRonald Welch – Knight CrusaderDrama
Tawfiq al-Hakim – El Aydi El Na'mah (Soft Hands)
Brendan Behan – The Quare Fellow
Dharamvir Bharati – Andha Yug (The Blind Age)
William Douglas Home – The Manor of Northstead
 Peter Jones – The Party Spirit
Saunders Lewis – Siwan
 Ronald Millar – Waiting for Gillian
Terence Rattigan – Separate Tables
Reginald Rose – Twelve Angry Men (original version as live teleplay)
Dylan Thomas – Under Milk Wood (radio play)
Thornton Wilder – The Matchmaker
Herman Wouk – The Caine Mutiny Court-Martial

Poetry
Tomas Tranströmer – 17 Poems (17 dikter)Non-fiction
Gordon Allport – The Nature of PrejudiceL. Sprague de Camp – Lost ContinentsRodney Collin – The Theory of Celestial InfluenceAlbert Einstein – Ideas and OpinionsGerald Gardner – Witchcraft TodayAldous Huxley – The Doors of PerceptionArthur Koestler – The Invisible Writing: The Second Volume Of An Autobiography, 1932–40D. R. Matthews – The Social Background of Political Decision-MakersMervyn Peake – Figures of SpeechA. J. P. Taylor – The Struggle for Mastery in Europe 1848–1918Alice B. Toklas – The Alice B. Toklas CookbookWilliam Kurtz Wimsatt, Jr. – Verbal Icon: Studies in the Meaning of Poetry (collected essays including "The Intentional Fallacy" and "The Affective Fallacy", cowritten with Monroe Beardsley)
Barbara WoodhouseDog Training my WayTalking to Animals (autobiography)

Births
January 5 – László Krasznahorkai, Hungarian novelist and screenwriter
January 15 – Jose Dalisay, Jr., Filipino writer
January 29 – Oprah Winfrey, American actress and talk show host
January – Cao Wenxuan (曹文軒), Chinese children's book writer and academic
February 2 – Moniza Alvi, Pakistani-British poet and writer
March 4 – Irina Ratushinskaya, Russian writer
May 6 – Nicholas Crane, English writer, geographer and broadcaster
March 16 – S. A. Griffin, American actor and poet
March 20
Christoph Ransmayr, Austrian writer
Louis Sachar, American children's author
April 14 – Bruce Sterling, American science-fiction writer
May 5 – Hamid Ismailov, Uzbek writer
May 23 – Anja Snellman, Finnish writer
June 6 – Cynthia Rylant, American children's author and poet
June 28 – A. A. Gill, British journalist and critic (died 2016)
July 17 – J. Michael Straczynski, American author
July 26 - Michael Grant, American young-adult fiction writer
August 1 – James Gleick, American non-fiction author
August 15 – Mary Jo Salter, American poet and academic
August 17 – Anatoly Kudryavitsky, Russian-Irish writer
September 14 – Mikey Smith, Jamaican dub poet (killed 1983)
November 8 – Kazuo Ishiguro, Japanese-born English novelist and Nobel laureate
November 10 – Marlene van Niekerk, South African novelist
November 11 – Mary Gaitskill, American novelist, essayist and short story writer
November 12 – Christopher Pike (Kevin Christopher McFadden), American children's author
December 3 – Grace Andreacchi, American author
December 7 – Mark Hofmann, American rare book dealer, forger and murderer
December 20 – Sandra Cisneros, American writerunknown datesEsther Delisle, French Canadian author and historian
Ibrahim Nasrallah, Jordanian/Palestinian poet and novelist
Roma Tearne (Roma Chrysostom), Sri Lankan novelist and artist

Deaths
January 1 – Duff Cooper (1st Viscount Norwich), English poet, biographer and politician (born 1890)
January 21 – E. K. Chambers, English literary scholar (born 1866)
January 25 – M. N. Roy, Indian philosopher and politician (born 1887)
February 2 – Hella Wuolijoki, Estonian-born Finnish writer (born 1886)
February 6 – Maxwell Bodenheim, American poet and novelist (born 1892; murdered)
March 28 – Francis Brett Young, English novelist and poet (born 1884)
April 8
Juan Álvarez, Argentinian historian (born 1878)
Winnifred Eaton, Canadian author (born 1875)
Cicely Fox Smith, English poet and nautical writer (born 1882)
April 19 – Russell Davenport, American journalist and publisher (born 1899)
May 3 – Earnest Hooton, American writer on anthropology (born 1887)
June 18 – Constantin Beldie, Romanian literary promoter and memoirist (born 1887)
July 13 – Grantland Rice, American sportswriter (born 1880)
July 14 – Jacinto Benavente, Spanish dramatist and Nobel laureate (born 1866)
August 2 – Julián Padrón, Venezuelan novelist, journalist and lawyer (born 1910)
August 3 – Colette, French novelist (born 1873)
September 19 – Miles Franklin, Australian novelist (born 1879)
September 29 – W. J. Gruffydd, Welsh-language journal editor (born 1881)
October 22 – Oswald de Andrade, Brazilian poet and polemicist (born 1890)
November 17 – Ludovic Dauș, Romanian novelist and dramatist (born 1873)
December 6 – Lucien Tesnière, French grammarian (born 1893)
December 20 – James Hilton, English novelist (born 1900)

Awards
Carnegie Medal for children's literature: Ronald Welch, Knight CrusaderJames Tait Black Memorial Prize for fiction: C. P. Snow, The New Men and The MastersJames Tait Black Memorial Prize for biography: Keith Feiling, Warren HastingsNewbery Medal for children's literature: Joseph Krumgold, ...And Now MiguelNobel Prize for Literature: Ernest Miller Hemingway
Premio Nadal: Francisco Alcántara, La muerte sienta bien a VillalobosPrix Goncourt: Simone de Beauvoir, Les mandarinsPulitzer Prize for Drama: John Patrick, The Teahouse of the August MoonPulitzer Prize for Fiction: no award givenPulitzer Prize for Poetry: Theodore Roethke: TheWaking''
Queen's Gold Medal for Poetry: Ralph Hodgson

References

 
Years of the 20th century in literature